The Tuntex Highrise Building is a residential skyscraper located in Zhonghe District, New Taipei, Taiwan. As of December 2020, it is the 14th tallest building in New Taipei.

See also 
 List of tallest buildings in Taiwan
 List of tallest buildings in New Taipei City

References

1998 establishments in Taiwan
Residential skyscrapers in Taiwan
Skyscrapers in New Taipei
Apartment buildings in Taiwan